Panchajanyam may refer to:

Panchajanyam, Malayalam film released in 1982 directed by K. G. Rajasekharan
Panchajanyam, Malayalam film released in 2004 directed by Prasad